Bourj Hammoud Stadium is a stadium in Bourj Hammoud, Beirut, Lebanon. It is currently used mostly for football matches. The stadium has a capacity of 8,000 people.

References

Football venues in Beirut